Cesar Osvaldo La Paglia (born 25 February 1979 in Buenos Aires) is an Argentine football midfielder.

La Paglia started his career at Argentinos Juniors but he was soon sold to Argentine team Boca Juniors. In his first spell with Boca he was part of three League titles. In 2001, he moved to Talleres de Córdoba but in 2003 he returned to Boca for a second spell with the club. It was during this brief spell at Boca that he won the Copa Libertadores.

Between 2004 and 2006 he played for Spanish side CD Tenerife, in 2006 he moved to Vitória F.C. and in 2007 he moved to Independiente Medellín. During the transfer window in January, the Chinese club of Wuhan Guanggu signed him for a one-year contract. On May 11, 2008 he was released from Wuhan Guanggu and spent the second half of 2008 with Defensor Sporting of Uruguay.

In 2009 La Paglia returned to Argentina to join San Martín de Tucumán.

Titles

References 
 Argentine Primera Statistics
Biography by HistoriadeBoca.com.ar

1979 births
Living people
Argentine footballers
Association football midfielders
Argentinos Juniors footballers
Boca Juniors footballers
Talleres de Córdoba footballers
San Martín de Tucumán footballers
CD Tenerife players
Vitória F.C. players
Independiente Medellín footballers
Expatriate footballers in China
Expatriate footballers in Colombia
Expatriate footballers in Uruguay
Expatriate footballers in Portugal
Defensor Sporting players
Primeira Liga players
Argentine Primera División players
Segunda División players
Categoría Primera A players
Uruguayan Primera División players
Argentine expatriate footballers
Argentine expatriate sportspeople in Spain
Footballers from Buenos Aires